Scott Reynolds Nelson is the Georgia Athletic Association Professor of History at the University of Georgia. He was formerly the Legum Professor of History at the College of William and Mary. He is a historian of the American Civil War and the Gilded Age. He specializes in African-American history and Labor history.

Awards received
for Steel Drivin' Man
 2006 National Award for Arts Writing 
 2007 Merle Curti Award 
 2007 Anisfield-Wolf Award 
 2007 Virginia Literary Award for Nonfiction 
for Ain't Nothing But a Man
 2008 Publishers Weekly Best Books of the Year 
 2009 Aesop Prize (Folklore Society of America) 
 2009 Jane Addams Prize, Women's International League for Peace and Freedom
 2009 Notable Children's Book in the Language Arts, National Center for Teachers of English
 2009 American Library Association Best Book for Young Adults

Works

References

External links
"Author's website"

"Interview with Scott Reynolds Nelson", Sound Authors Radio, January 9, 2009
"The depression of 1929 is the wrong model for the current economic crisis", Chronicle of Higher Education, 10-17-08
"How the Crash Will Reshape America", The Atlantic, Richard Florida
"Interview with Scott Reynolds Nelson", Quiddity International Literary Journal and Public-Radio Program, February 4, 2010
"Attribution Lacking, or, The Day a Dutch Newspaper Stole My Grandmother", Chronicle of Higher Education, April 24, 2009

Historians of the Southern United States
Historians of the United States
College of William & Mary faculty
Living people
21st-century American historians
21st-century American male writers
Historians of the American Civil War
1964 births
American male non-fiction writers